Pyotr Valeryevich Sedunov (born 28 September 1977) is a Russian former professional footballer.

External links
 

1977 births
Living people
Russian footballers
Association football defenders
Russian Premier League players
Russian expatriate footballers
Expatriate footballers in Sweden
FC Chernomorets Novorossiysk players
PFC CSKA Moscow players
Bodens BK players
Östers IF players
FC Metallurg Lipetsk players
IFK Luleå players
FC Irtysh Omsk players